{|class="wikitable"
|-bgcolor="#efefef"
! Season
! Div.
! Pos.
! Pl.
! W
! D
! L
! GS
! GA
! P
!Domestic Cup
!colspan=2|Other
!Notes
|-bgcolor=PowderBlue
|align=center|2010–11
|align=center|Serie A
|align=center bgcolor=gold|1
|align=center|26
|align=center|25
|align=center|1
|align=center|0
|align=center|98
|align=center|8
|align=center|76
| style="text-align:center; background:gold"|Winner
|align=center|
|align=center| 
| style="text-align:center; background:gold"|Winner
|-bgcolor=PowderBlue
|align=center|2011–12
|align=center|Serie A
|align=center bgcolor=gold|1
|align=center|26
|align=center|21
|align=center|3
|align=center|2
|align=center|83
|align=center|11
|align=center|66
|align=center|
|align=center|
|align=center|
| style="text-align:center; background:gold"|Winner
|-bgcolor=PowderBlue
|align=center|2012–13
|align=center|Serie A
|align=center bgcolor=gold|1
|align=center|30
|align=center|26
|align=center|3
|align=center|1
|align=center|108
|align=center|13
|align=center|81
|align=center|
|align=center|
|align=center|
| style="text-align:center; background:gold"|Winner
|-bgcolor=PowderBlue
|align=center|2013–14
|align=center|Serie A
|align=center bgcolor=silver|2
|align=center|30
|align=center|27
|align=center|1
|align=center|2
|align=center|108
|align=center|18
|align=center|82
|align=center|
|align=center|
|align=center|
|align=center|
|-bgcolor=lightgrey
|align=center colspan="14"|Disbanded 
|-bgcolor=PowderBlue
|align=center|2020–21
|align=center|Serie C
|align=center bgcolor=gold|1
|align=center|
|align=center|
|align=center|
|align=center|
|align=center|
|align=center|
|align=center|
|align=center|
|align=center|
|align=center|
|align=center bgcolor=lightgreen|Promoted
|-bgcolor=PowderBlue
|align=center|2021–22
|align=center|Serie B
|align=center|5
|align=center|26
|align=center|13	 	
|align=center|3
|align=center|10
|align=center|35
|align=center|37
|align=center|42
|align=center|
|align=center|
|align=center|
|align=center|
|}

References

External links 

 
 Historical Archives

A.S.D. FC Sassari Torres Femminile
Seasons